Poppleton Fire Station, also known as Engine House #38, is a historic fire station located at Baltimore, Maryland, United States. It is a Tudor Revival style building built of brick, one large bay wide, approximately nine bays long, and two stories high with a gable roof. The front façade is a brick and limestone composition featuring a central, Tudor archway flanked by octagonal towers and crowned with crenellation. The archway features engaged colonettes with carved, foliated capitals containing firemen racing to extinguish a fire. It was designed by Owens and Sisco and built in 1910.

Poppleton Fire Station was listed on the National Register of Historic Places in 1983.

See also
Fire departments in Maryland
Engine House No. 6 (Baltimore, Maryland)
Engine House No. 8 (Baltimore, Maryland)
Paca Street Firehouse

References

External links
, including photo from 1983, at Maryland Historical Trust

Fire stations completed in 1910
Fire stations on the National Register of Historic Places in Maryland
Government buildings on the National Register of Historic Places in Baltimore
Tudor Revival architecture in Maryland
Hollins Market, Baltimore